Beltane is the Gaelic May Day festival. Commonly observed on the first of May, the festival falls midway between the spring equinox and summer solstice in the northern hemisphere. The festival name is synonymous with the month marking the start of summer in Ireland, May being Mí na Bealtaine. Historically, it was widely observed throughout Ireland, Scotland, and the Isle of Man. Beltane is one of the principal four Gaelic seasonal festivals—along with Samhain, Imbolc, and Lughnasadh—and is similar to the Welsh .

Bealtaine is mentioned in the earliest Irish literature and is associated with important events in Irish mythology. Rituals were performed to protect cattle, people and crops, and to encourage growth. Special bonfires were kindled, whose flames, smoke and ashes were deemed to have protective powers. The people and their cattle would walk around or between bonfires, and sometimes leap over the flames or embers. All household fires would be doused and then re-lit from the Bealtaine bonfire. Doors, windows, byres and livestock would be decorated with yellow May flowers, perhaps because they evoked fire. In parts of Ireland, people would make a May Bush: typically a thorn bush or branch decorated with flowers, ribbons, bright shells and rushlights. Holy wells were also visited, while Bealtaine dew was thought to bring beauty and maintain youthfulness. Many of these customs were part of May Day or Midsummer festivals in parts of Great Britain and Europe.

Public celebrations of Beltane fell out of popularity, though some customs continue to be revived as local cultural events. Since the late 20th century, Celtic neopagans and Wiccans have observed a festival based on Beltane as a religious holiday. Some neopagans in the Southern Hemisphere celebrate Beltane on or around 1 November.

Historic customs
Beltane was one of four Gaelic seasonal festivals: Samhain (1 November), Imbolc (1 February), Beltane (1 May), and Lughnasadh (1 August). Beltane marked the beginning of the pastoral summer season, when livestock were driven out to the summer pastures. Rituals were held at that time to protect them from harm, both natural and supernatural, and this mainly involved the "symbolic use of fire". There were also rituals to protect crops, dairy products and people, and to encourage growth. The  (often referred to as spirits or fairies) were thought to be especially active at Beltane (as at Samhain) and the goal of many Beltane rituals was to appease them. Beltane was a "spring time festival of optimism" during which "fertility ritual again was important, perhaps connecting with the waxing power of the sun".

Ancient and medieval
Beltane (the beginning of summer) and Samhain (the beginning of winter) are thought to have been the most important of the four Gaelic festivals. Sir James George Frazer wrote in The Golden Bough: A Study in Magic and Religion that the times of Beltane and Samhain are of little importance to European crop-growers, but of great importance to herdsmen. Thus, he suggests that halving the year at 1 May and 1 November dates from a time when the Celts were mainly a pastoral people, dependent on their herds.

The earliest mention of Beltane is in Old Irish literature from Gaelic Ireland. The texts say that, to protect cattle from disease, druids would make two fires "with great incantations" and drive the cattle between them.

According to 17th-century historian Geoffrey Keating, there was a great gathering at the hill of Uisneach each Beltane in medieval Ireland, where a sacrifice was made to a god named Beil. Keating wrote that two bonfires would be lit in every district of Ireland, and cattle would be driven between them to protect them from disease. There is no reference to such a gathering in the annals, but the medieval Dindsenchas (lore of places) includes a tale of a hero lighting a holy fire on Uisneach that blazed for seven years. Ronald Hutton writes that this may "preserve a tradition of Beltane ceremonies there", but adds "Keating or his source may simply have conflated this legend with the information in Sanas Chormaic to produce a piece of pseudo-history". Nevertheless, excavations at Uisneach in the 20th century found evidence of large fires and charred bones, and showed it to have been a place of ritual since ancient times. Evidence suggests it was "a sanctuary-site, in which fire was kept burning perpetually, or kindled at frequent intervals", where animal sacrifices were offered.

Beltane is also mentioned in medieval Scottish literature. An early reference is found in the poem 'Peblis to the Play', contained in the Maitland Manuscripts of 15th- and 16th-century Scots poetry, which describes the celebration in the town of Peebles.

Modern era
From the late 18th century to the mid 20th century, many accounts of Beltane customs were recorded by folklorists and other writers. For example John Jamieson, in his Etymological Dictionary of the Scottish Language (1808), describes some of the Beltane customs which persisted in the 18th and early 19th centuries in parts of Scotland, which he noted were beginning to die out. In the 19th century, folklorist Alexander Carmichael (1832–1912), collected the Scottish Gaelic song Am Beannachadh Bealltain (The Beltane Blessing) in his Carmina Gadelica, which he heard from a crofter in South Uist. The first two verses were sung as follows:

Beannaich, a Thrianailt fhioir nach gann, (Bless, O Threefold true and bountiful,)
Mi fein, mo cheile agus mo chlann, (Myself, my spouse and my children,)
Mo chlann mhaoth's am mathair chaomh 'n an ceann, (My tender children and their beloved mother at their head,)
Air chlar chubhr nan raon, air airidh chaon nam beann, (On the fragrant plain, at the gay mountain sheiling,)
Air chlar chubhr nan raon, air airidh chaon nam beann. (On the fragrant plain, at the gay mountain sheiling.)

Gach ni na m' fhardaich, no ta 'na m' shealbh, (Everything within my dwelling or in my possession,)
Gach buar is barr, gach tan is tealbh, (All kine and crops, all flocks and corn,)
Bho Oidhche Shamhna chon Oidhche Bheallt, (From Hallow Eve to Beltane Eve,)
Piseach maith, agus beannachd mallt, (With goodly progress and gentle blessing,)
Bho mhuir, gu muir, agus bun gach allt, (From sea to sea, and every river mouth,)
Bho thonn gu tonn, agus bonn gach steallt. (From wave to wave, and base of waterfall.)

Bonfires

Bonfires continued to be a key part of the festival in the modern era. All hearth fires and candles would be doused before the bonfire was lit, generally on a mountain or hill. Ronald Hutton writes that "To increase the potency of the holy flames, in Britain at least they were often kindled by the most primitive of all means, of friction between wood." This is known as a need-fire or force-fire. In the 19th century, John Ramsay described Scottish Highlanders kindling such a fire at Beltane, which was deemed sacred. In the 19th century, the ritual of driving cattle between two fires—as described in Sanas Cormaic almost 1000 years before—was still practised across most of Ireland and in parts of Scotland. Sometimes the cattle would be driven around a bonfire or be made to leap over flames or embers. The people themselves would do likewise. On the Isle of Man, people ensured that the smoke blew over them and their cattle. When the bonfire had died down, people would daub themselves with its ashes and sprinkle it over their crops and livestock. Burning torches from the bonfire would be taken home, carried around the house or boundary of the farmstead, and used to re-light the hearth. From these rituals, it is clear that the fire was seen as having protective powers. Similar rituals were part of May Day or Midsummer customs in other parts of the British Isles and mainland Europe. Frazer believed the fire rituals are a kind of imitative or sympathetic magic. He suggests they were meant to mimic the Sun and "ensure a needful supply of sunshine for men, animals, and plants", as well as to symbolically "burn up and destroy all harmful influences".

Food was also cooked at the bonfire and there were rituals involving it. In the Scottish Highlands, Alexander Carmichael recorded that there was a feast featuring lamb, and that formerly this lamb was sacrificed. In 1769, Thomas Pennant wrote of bonfires in Perthshire, where a caudle made from eggs, butter, oatmeal and milk was cooked. Some of the mixture was poured on the ground as a libation. Everyone present would then take an oatmeal cake, called the bannoch Bealltainn or "Beltane bannock". A bit was offered to the spirits to protect their livestock (one to protect the horses, one to protect the sheep, and so forth) and a bit offered to each of the predators that might harm their livestock (one to the fox, one to the eagle, and so forth). Afterwards, they would drink the caudle.

According to 18th century writers, in parts of Scotland there was another ritual involving the oatmeal cake. The cake would be cut and one of the slices marked with charcoal. The slices would then be put in a bonnet and everyone would take one out while blindfolded. According to one writer, whoever got the marked piece had to leap through the fire three times. According to another, those present pretended to throw the person into the fire and, for some time afterwards, would speak of them as if they were dead. This "may embody a memory of actual human sacrifice", or it may have always been symbolic. A similar ritual (i.e. of pretending to burn someone in the fire) was part of spring and summer bonfire festivals in other parts of Europe.

Flowers and May Bushes

Yellow and white flowers such as primrose, rowan, hawthorn, gorse, hazel, and marsh marigold were traditionally placed at doorways and windows; this is documented in 19th century Ireland, Scotland and Mann. Sometimes loose flowers were strewn at doors and windows and sometimes they were made into bouquets, garlands or crosses and fastened to them. They would also be fastened to cows and equipment for milking and butter making. It is likely that such flowers were used because they evoked fire. Similar May Day customs are found across Europe.

The May Bush or May Bough was popular in parts of Ireland until the late 19th century. This was a small tree or branch—typically hawthorn, rowan, holly or sycamore—decorated with bright flowers, ribbons, painted shells or eggshells from Easter Sunday, and so forth. The tree would either be decorated where it stood, or branches would be decorated and placed inside or outside the house (particularly above windows and doors, on the roof, and on barns). It was generally the responsibility of the oldest person of the house to decorate the May Bush, and the tree would remain up until May 31st. The tree would also be decorated with candles or rushlights. Sometimes a May Bush would be paraded through the town. In parts of southern Ireland, gold and silver hurling balls known as May Balls would be hung on these May Bushes and handed out to children or given to the winners of a hurling match. In Dublin and Belfast, May Bushes were brought into town from the countryside and decorated by the whole neighbourhood. Each neighbourhood vied for the most handsome tree and, sometimes, residents of one would try to steal the May Bush of another. This led to the May Bush being outlawed in Victorian times. In some places, it was customary to sing and dance around the May Bush, and at the end of the festivities it may be burnt in the bonfire. In some areas the May Bush or Bough has also been called the "May Pole", but it is the bush or tree described above, and not the more commonly-known European maypole.

Thorn trees are traditionally seen as special trees, associated with the aos sí. Frazer believed the customs of decorating trees or poles in springtime are a relic of tree worship and wrote: "The intention of these customs is to bring home to the village, and to each house, the blessings which the tree-spirit has in its power to bestow." Emyr Estyn Evans suggests that the May Bush custom may have come to Ireland from England, because it seemed to be found in areas with strong English influence and because the Irish saw it as unlucky to damage certain thorn trees. However, "lucky" and "unlucky" trees varied by region, and it has been suggested that Beltane was the only time when cutting thorn trees was allowed. The practice of bedecking a May Bush with flowers, ribbons, garlands and bright shells is found among the Gaelic diaspora, most notably in Newfoundland, and in some Easter traditions on the East Coast of the United States.

Appeasing the fairies 
Many Beltane practices were designed to ward off or appease the fairies and prevent them from stealing dairy products. For example, three black coals were placed under a butter churn to ensure the fairies did not steal the butter, and May Boughs were tied to milk pails, the tails of cattle or hung in the barns to ensure the cattle's milk was not stolen. Flowers were also used to decorate the horns of cattle, which was believed to bring good fortune. However, milk was never given to a neighbor on May Day because it was feared that the milk would be transferred to the neighbor's cow. In Ireland, cattle would be brought to 'fairy forts', where a small amount of their blood would be collected. The owners would then pour it into the earth with prayers for the herd's safety. Sometimes the blood would be left to dry and then be burnt. It was thought that dairy products were especially at risk from harmful spirits. To protect farm produce and encourage fertility, farmers would lead a procession around the boundaries of their farm. They would "carry with them seeds of grain, implements of husbandry, the first well water, and the herb vervain (or rowan as a substitute). The procession generally stopped at the four cardinal points of the compass, beginning in the east, and rituals were performed in each of the four directions". People made the sign of the cross with milk for good luck on Beltane, and the sign of the cross was also made on the backsides of cattle.

Other customs
Holy wells were often visited at Beltane, and at the other Gaelic festivals of Imbolc and Lughnasadh. Visitors to holy wells would pray for health while walking sunwise (moving from east to west) around the well. They would then leave offerings; typically coins or clooties (see clootie well). The first water drawn from a well on Beltane was thought to be especially potent, and would bring good luck to the person who drew it. Beltane morning dew was also thought to bring good luck and health. At dawn or before sunrise on Beltane, maidens would roll in the dew or wash their faces with it. The dew was collected in a jar, left in sunlight, then filtered. The dew was thought to increase sexual attractiveness, maintain youthfulness, protect from sun damage (particularly freckles and sunburn) and help with skin ailments for the ensuing year. It was also thought that a man who washed his face with soap and water on Beltane will grow long whiskers on his face.

It was widely believed that no one should light a fire on May Day morning until they saw smoke rising from a neighbor's house. It was also believed to be bad luck to put out ashes or clothes on May Day, and to give away coal or ashes would cause the giver difficulty in lighting fires for the next year. Also, if the family owned a white horse, it should remain in the barn all day, and if any other horse was owned, a red rag should be tied to its tail. Any foal born on May Day was fated to kill a man, and any cow that calved on May Day would die. Any birth or marriage on May Day was generally believed to be ill-fated. On May Night a cake and a jug were left on the table, because it was believed that the Irish who had died abroad would return on May Day to their ancestral homes, and it was also believed that the dead returned on May Day to visit their friends. A robin that flew into the house on Beltane was believed to portend the death of a household member.

The festival persisted widely up until the 1950s, and in some places the celebration of Beltane continues today.

Revival

As a festival, Beltane had largely died out by the mid-20th century, although some of its customs continued and in some places it has been revived as a cultural event. In Ireland, Beltane fires were common until the mid-20th century, but the custom seems to have lasted to the present day only in County Limerick (especially in Limerick itself) and in Arklow, County Wicklow. The lighting of a community Beltane fire from which each hearth fire is then relit is observed today in some parts of the Gaelic diaspora, though in most of these cases it is a cultural revival rather than an unbroken survival of the ancient tradition. In parts of Newfoundland, the custom of decorating the May Bush also survives. The town of Peebles in the Scottish Borders holds a traditional week-long Beltane Fair every year in June, when a local girl is crowned Beltane Queen on the steps of the parish church. Like other Borders festivals, it incorporates a Common Riding.

Since 1988, a Beltane Fire Festival has been held every year on the night of 30 April on Calton Hill in Edinburgh, Scotland. While inspired by traditional Beltane, it is a modern celebration of summer's beginning which draws on many influences. The performance art event involves fire dances and a procession by costumed performers, led by the May Queen and the Green Man, culminating in the lighting of a bonfire.

Butser Ancient Farm, an open-air archaeology museum in Hampshire, UK, has also held a Beltane festival since the 1980s. The festival mixes historical reenactment with folk influences, and features a May Queen and Green Man, living history displays, reenactor battles, demonstrations of traditional crafts, performances of folk music, and Celtic storytelling. The festival ends with the burning of a 30-40ft wickerman, with a new historical or folk-inspired design each year.

A similar Bealtaine Festival has been held each year since 2009 at Uisneach in Ireland. It culminates in a torchlit procession by participants in costume, some on horseback, and the lighting of a large bonfire at dusk. In 2017, the ceremonial fire was lit by the President of Ireland, Michael D Higgins.

The 1970 recording 'Ride a White Swan', written and performed by Marc Bolan and his band T.Rex, contains the line "Ride a white Swan like the people of the Beltane".

Neopaganism

Beltane and Beltane-based festivals are held by some Neopagans. As there are many kinds of Neopaganism, their Beltane celebrations can be very different despite the shared name. Some try to emulate the historic festival as much as possible. Other Neopagans base their celebrations on many sources, the Gaelic festival being only one of them.

Neopagans usually celebrate Beltane on 30 April – 1 May in the Northern Hemisphere and 31 October – 1 November in the Southern Hemisphere, beginning and ending at sunset. Some Neopagans celebrate it at the astronomical midpoint between the spring equinox and summer solstice (or the full moon nearest this point). In the Northern Hemisphere, this midpoint is when the ecliptic longitude of the Sun reaches 45 degrees. In 2014, this was on 5 May.

Celtic Reconstructionist
Celtic Reconstructionists strive to reconstruct ancient Celtic religion. Their religious practices are based on research and historical accounts, but modified to suit modern life. They avoid syncretism and eclecticism (i.e. combining practises from unrelated cultures).

Celtic Reconstructionists usually celebrate Beltane when the local hawthorn trees are in bloom. Many observe the traditional bonfire rites, to whatever extent this is feasible where they live. This may involve passing themselves and their pets or livestock between two bonfires, and bringing home a candle lit from the bonfire. If they are unable to make a bonfire or attend a bonfire ceremony, candles may be used instead. They may decorate their homes with a May Bush, branches from blooming thorn trees, or equal-armed rowan crosses. Holy wells may be visited and offerings made to the spirits or deities of the wells. Traditional festival foods may also be prepared.

Wicca
Wiccans use the name Beltane or Beltain for their May Day celebrations. It is one of the yearly Sabbats of their Wheel of the Year, following Ostara and preceding Midsummer. Unlike Celtic Reconstructionism, Wicca is syncretic and melds practices from many different cultures. In general, the Wiccan Beltane is more akin to the Germanic/English May Day festival, both in its significance (focusing on fertility) and its rituals (such as maypole dancing). Some Wiccans enact a ritual union of the May Lord and May Lady.

Name
Sometimes the older Scottish Gaelic spelling  is used.

The name is anglicized as Beltane, Beltain, Beltaine, Beltine and Beltany.

Etymology
Two modern etymologies have been proposed. Beltaine could derive from a Common Celtic , meaning 'bright fire'. The element  might be cognate with the English word bale (as in ) meaning 'white', 'bright' or 'shining'. The absence of syncope (Irish sound laws rather predict a **Beltne form) can be explained by the popular belief that Beltaine was a compound of the word for 'fire', tene.

Toponymy

There are place names in Ireland containing the word , indicating places where Bealtaine festivities were once held. It is often anglicised as Beltany. There are three Beltanys in County Donegal, including the Beltany stone circle, and two in County Tyrone. In County Armagh there is a place called Tamnaghvelton/ ('the Beltane field'). Lisbalting/ ('the Beltane ringfort') is in County Tipperary, while Glasheennabaultina/ ('the Beltane stream') is the name of a stream joining the River Galey in County Limerick.

See also 

 Samhain
 Celtic calendar
 Calan Mai
 Walpurgis Night

References

Further reading
 Carmichael, Alexander (1992). Carmina Gadelica. Lindisfarne Press. 
 Chadwick, Nora (1970) The Celts. London, Penguin 
 Danaher, Kevin (1972) The Year in Ireland. Dublin, Mercier 
 Evans-Wentz, W. Y. (1966, 1990) The Fairy-Faith in Celtic Countries. New York, Citadel 
 MacKillop, James (1998).  Dictionary of Celtic Mythology. Oxford University Press 
 McNeill, F. Marian (1959) The Silver Bough, Vol. 1–4. William MacLellan, Glasgow
 Simpson, Eve Blantyre (1908), Folk Lore in Lowland Scotland, London: J.M. Dent.

External links
 Edinburgh's Beltane Fire Society
 Extract on The Beltane Fires from Sir James George Frazer's book The Golden Bough – 1922; from bartleby.com

April observances
Cross-quarter days
Gaelic culture
Holidays in Scotland
Irish culture
Irish folklore
Irish mythology
Irish words and phrases
Galician culture
Manx culture
May observances
Modern pagan holidays
November observances
Scottish culture
Scottish folklore
Scottish mythology